"Tell Me Do U Wanna" is a song by American R&B singer Ginuwine. It was written by Robert Reives, Jimmy Douglass, and Timbaland for his debut studio album Ginuwine...The Bachelor (1996), while production was helmed by the latter. It was released as the album's second single released in March 1997 and reached the top 20 on the UK Singles Chart.

Music video

The official music video for the song was directed by Michael Lucero.

Track listing

Notes
 denotes additional producer

Charts

References

External links
 

1996 songs
550 Music singles
Ginuwine songs
Music videos directed by Michael Lucero
Song recordings produced by Timbaland
Songs written by Timbaland
Songs written by Ginuwine
1997 singles